Justin Lofton (born February 18, 1986) is an American professional off-road racing driver. He also competes in stock car racing, driving part-time in the ARCA Menards Series West in the No. 30 Ford for Rette Jones Racing. Lofton formerly competed in stock car racing full-time, competing in the ARCA Racing Series and the NASCAR Camping World Truck Series. He is the 2009 champion.

Racing career

Lofton started his racing career in mountain bikes before moving to late models. He went on to run in both the NASCAR Camping World East and West Series, before landing in the ARCA Re/Max Series. In 2008, he began driving full-time for Eddie Sharp Racing, first driving the No. 93 before moving to the No. 20 for the remainder of the season. He earned his first career win that year at Michigan International Speedway, and would finish 13th in the standings.

Lofton narrowly won the 2009 ARCA Series championship over Parker Kligerman in his sophomore season. Throughout the season, he earned six wins, fifteen top 5s, nineteen top 10s, and five poles. In 2009, Lofton also made his Nationwide Series debut at Michigan. Driving the No. 14 Lofton Cattle Toyota for CJM Racing, he qualified 19th and finished 16th.

In 2010, Lofton drove the No. 7 VisitPIT.com Toyota for Red Horse Racing. He also ran a partial schedule in the Nationwide Series, driving the No. 71 Weekend Warriors TV Toyota for the same team, and the No. 27 Ford for Baker Curb Racing.

In 2010, Lofton had a best qualifying effort of third in Darlington, a best finish of third at Dover, and earned four top-five and eight top-10 finishes in the Camping World Truck Series. He finished 12th in the driver point standings. For 2011, Lofton joined defending champion team Germain Racing to drive the 77 truck. However, after Texas, Lofton and Germain parted ways. On June 22, Lofton announced on Sirius NASCAR Radio that he would return to Eddie Sharp Racing for the remainder of the season. He debuted in the No. 46 CollegeComplete.com Toyota at Kentucky Speedway on July 7 with a 15th-place finish.  Starting July 22, 2011 in Nashville, Lofton returned to the No. 6 where he previously won the ARCA series in 2009 in the No. 6.

Lofton drove the full season for Eddie Sharp Racing in the Camping World Truck Series, driving the No. 6 for the 2012 season.

On May 18, 2012, at Charlotte Motor Speedway, Lofton captured his first win, holding off Brad Keselowski and Todd Bodine.

Lofton returned to racing stock cars for the first time since 2014 when he made his West Series debut at Phoenix in November 2020, driving for Rette Jones Racing in the No. 30 car.

Off-road racing

After the 2012 season, Lofton announced that he would be scaling back his NASCAR schedule in 2013, instead primarily competing in the new Stadium Super Trucks being promoted by Robby Gordon. He collected three wins and resulted third in the standings behind Gordon and Rob MacCachren. In 2014 he competed at the St. Petersburg, X Games Austin, and Las Vegas rounds of the Stadium Super Trucks.

Lofton won the Best in the Desert Mint 400 overall and Trick Truck class in 2015, 2016 and 2019.

He Currently drivers the Fox, Yokohama Tires sponsored Trophy Truck.

Motorsports career results

NASCAR
(key) (Bold – Pole position awarded by qualifying time. Italics – Pole position earned by points standings or practice time. * – Most laps led.)

Nationwide Series

Camping World Truck Series

ARCA Menards Series
(key) (Bold – Pole position awarded by qualifying time. Italics – Pole position earned by points standings or practice time. * – Most laps led.)

ARCA Menards Series West

 Season still in progress

Stadium Super Trucks
(key) (Bold – Pole position. Italics – Fastest qualifier. * – Most laps led.)

 Season still in progress
 Ineligible for series points

References

External links
 

Living people
1986 births
People from Brawley, California
Racing drivers from California
24 Hours of Daytona drivers
NASCAR drivers
ARCA Menards Series drivers
Stadium Super Trucks drivers
X Games athletes